William Patrick Stuart-Houston (born William Patrick Hitler; 12 March 1911 – 14 July 1987) was an English-born half-nephew of Adolf Hitler. Born and raised in the Toxteth area of Liverpool to Adolf's half-brother Alois Hitler Jr. and his Irish wife Bridget Dowling, he later relocated to Germany to work for his half-uncle before emigrating to the United States, where he received American citizenship (in addition to his British citizenship) and ended up serving in the United States Navy against his half-uncle during World War II.

Biography

Early life
Stuart-Houston was born William Patrick Hitler in the Toxteth area of Liverpool in Great Britain on 12 March 1911, the son of Adolf Hitler's half-brother Alois Hitler Jr. and his Irish wife Bridget Dowling. The couple met in Dublin when Alois was living there during 1909; they married in London's Marylebone district in 1910 and relocated to Liverpool. The family lived in a flat at 102 Upper Stanhope Street, which was later destroyed during the last German air raid of the Liverpool Blitz on 10 January 1942. Dowling wrote a manuscript titled My Brother-in-Law Adolf, in which she claimed that Adolf had lived in Liverpool with her from November 1912 to April 1913 in order to avoid conscription in Austria. The book is largely considered a work of fiction, as Adolf was actually residing in the Meldemannstraße dormitory in Vienna at the time.

In 1914, Alois left Bridget and their son for a gambling tour of Europe. He later returned to Germany. Unable to rejoin his family due to the outbreak of World War I, he abandoned them, leaving William to be brought up by his mother. He remarried bigamously, but wrote to Bridget during the mid-1920s to ask her to send William to Germany's Weimar Republic for a visit. She finally agreed in 1929, when William was 18. By this time, Alois had another son named Heinz with his German wife. Heinz, in contrast to William, became a committed Nazi, joined the Wehrmacht, and died in Soviet captivity in 1942.

Nazi Germany
In 1933, William travelled to what had become Nazi Germany in an attempt to benefit from his half-uncle's growing power. Adolf, who was now chancellor, found him a job at the Reichskreditbank in Berlin, a job that he held for most of the 1930s. He later worked at the Opel automobile factory and as a car salesman. Dissatisfied with these jobs, he again asked his half-uncle for a better job, writing to him with blackmail threats of selling embarrassing stories about the family to the newspapers unless his "personal circumstances" improved.

In 1938, Adolf asked William to relinquish his British citizenship in exchange for a high-ranking job. Suspecting a trap, William fled Nazi Germany and again tried to blackmail his uncle with threats. This time, William threatened to tell the press that Adolf's alleged paternal grandfather was actually a Jewish merchant. He returned to London, where he wrote the article "Why I Hate My Uncle" for Look magazine.

Immigration to the United States
In January 1939, the newspaper magnate William Randolph Hearst brought William and his mother to the United States for a lecture tour. He and his mother were stranded when World War II began. After making a special request to President Franklin D. Roosevelt, William was eventually approved to join the United States Navy in 1944; he relocated to the Sunnyside neighbourhood of Queens, New York. William was drafted into the United States Navy during World War II as a pharmacist's mate (a designation later changed to hospital corpsman) until he was discharged in 1947. On reporting for duty, the induction officer asked his name. He replied, "Hitler." Thinking he was joking, the officer replied, "Glad to see you, Hitler. My name's Hess." William was wounded in action during the war and awarded the Purple Heart.

Later life
After being discharged from the Navy, William changed his surname to "Stuart-Houston". In 1947, he married Phyllis Jean-Jacques, who had been born in Germany in the mid-1920s. After their relationship began, William and Phyllis, along with Bridget, tried to live a life of anonymity in the United States. They moved to Patchogue, New York, where William used his medical training to establish a business that analyzed blood samples for hospitals. His laboratory, which he called Brookhaven Laboratories (no relation to Brookhaven National Laboratory), was located in his home, a two-story clapboard house at 71 Silver Street.

Stuart-Houston and his wife had four sons: Alexander Adolf (born 1949), Louis (born 1951), Howard Ronald (1957–1989), and Brian William (born 1965). None of his sons had children of their own. In his 2001 book The Last of the Hitlers, journalist David Gardner speculated that the four brothers had made a verbal pact not to sire children. This claim was explicitly denied by eldest son Alexander, stating that before his death Howard Ronald had been engaged and intending to have children, while another brother had been engaged once, but the relationship had been destroyed by the family notoriety. His third son, Howard Ronald Stuart-Houston, worked as a Special Agent with the Criminal Investigation Division of the Internal Revenue Service (IRS) and died in a car accident on September 14, 1989.

Stuart-Houston died in Patchogue on 14 July 1987. His remains were buried next to his mother's at the Holy Sepulchre Cemetery in Coram, New York. His widow, Phyllis, died in 2004.

In the media
The family's story and Bridget's memoirs were first published by Michael Unger in the Liverpool Daily Post in 1973. Unger also edited Bridget Dowling's memoirs, which were first published as The Memoirs of Bridget Hitler in 1979; a completely updated version, titled The Hitlers of Liverpool, was published in 2011.

Beryl Bainbridge's 1978 novel Young Adolf depicts the alleged 1912–13 visit to his Liverpool relatives by a 23-year-old Adolf Hitler. Bainbridge adapted the story into a play as The Journal of Bridget Hitler with director Philip Saville, which was broadcast as a Playhouse (BBC 2) in 1981.

Grant Morrison and Steve Yeowell's 1989 comic book The New Adventures of Hitler is likewise based on the alleged Liverpool visit.

In October 2005, The History Channel broadcast a one-hour documentary titled Hitler's Family, in which William Patrick Hitler is described along with other relatives of Adolf Hitler.

Netflix aired a documentary titled The Pact: Le serment des Hitler (2014), directed by Emmanuel Amara, which was billed as a retracing of the life of Hitler, and an exploration of what became of the Hitler family line.

William Patrick Hitler was portrayed in the sketch "Willy Hitler Fights the Germans" in the 19 June 2018 episode of the American Comedy Central television series Drunk History, which aired as the eighth episode of that show's fifth season.

See also
 Hitler family

References

 Brown, Jonathan and Oliver Duff. "The black sheep of the family? The rise and fall of Hitler's scouse nephew" in The Independent, 17 August 2006
 Gardner, David. The Last of the Hitlers, BMM, 2001, 
 Green, Jesse. The Search for the Long Island Hitlers, The New York Times, 9 April 2006
 Halmburger, Oliver, Timothy W. Ryback & Florian M. Beierl: Hitler's Family – In the Shadow of the Dictator, Loopfilm / ZDF Enterprises, 2006.
 
 McCarthy, Tony. "Hitler: His Irish Relatives"; Irish Roots Magazine; no. 1, First Quarter 1992 (Retrieved: 10 March 2016)
 Royden, M.W. "Your Story: Adolf Hitler – did he visit Liverpool during 1912–13?", BBC Legacies; Liverpool, February 2004
 Toland, John. Adolf Hitler, 
 Vermeeren, Marc. "De jeugd van Adolf Hitler 1889–1907 en zijn familie en voorouders"; Soesterberg, 2007; Aspekt B.V. publishers;  (in Dutch)

External links
 Getting to know the Hitlers from The Daily Telegraph
 Author talks about 'the Last of the Hitlers' CNN interview.
 The Diocese of Rockville Centre – Holy Sepulchre Cemetery
 Kilgannon, Corey. "Three Quiet Brothers on Long Island, All of Them Related to Hitler", The New York Times, 24 April 2006

1911 births
1987 deaths
People from Toxteth
United States Navy personnel of World War II
English emigrants to the United States
English people of Austrian descent
English people of Irish descent
Hitler family
People from Patchogue, New York
United States Navy sailors
People from Coram, New York
People from Sunnyside, Queens
Military personnel from New York City